Eldbjørg is a given name. Notable people with the given name include:

Eldbjørg Hemsing (born 1990), Norwegian violinist
Eldbjørg Løwer (born 1943), Norwegian politician
Eldbjørg Raknes (born 1970), Norwegian jazz vocalist 
Eldbjørg Willassen, Norwegian handball player